Digs or DIGS my refer to:

Archaeological digs
Derby Independent Grammar School
JR Digs, Canadian television personality
Deputy inspector generals of police (DIGs)
DIGS Trondheim, Coworking space
colloquial British term for lodgings

See also 
 Dig (disambiguation)